A commissary is a store for provisions which can include prepared foods for eating either on-premises or off-premises. It is usually run within an organization such as a mining operation, a steel mill, a corporate center, or a government or military unit, and is usually intended, primarily, for the use of employees.

Eligibility 

Eligible patrons of United Nations Commissaries include
 diplomatic members of Permanent Mission
 officials of the United Nations Office
 officials of other UN entities
 heads of delegations of UN Member States

Eligible patrons of US Military Commissaries include
 active-duty personnel
 retired service members
 Guard and Reserve personnel
 immediate family members of service personnel
 Purple Heart recipients
 Medal of Honor recipients
 former prisoners of war
 veterans with any service-connected disability
 caregivers registered with the VA's Comprehensive Assistance for Family Caregivers program.

U.S. Military Commissary Benefits 
U.S. Military commissaries are run by the Defense Commissary Agency. Military commissaries serve to provide groceries and household goods, at a reasonable cost, to many members within the Department of Defense regardless of the country in which the service members are posted. 
A secondary benefit of US military Commissaries is the opportunity for employment of family members. This is especially significant in overseas locations where acquiring a job could prove difficult for U.S. citizens.
A U.S. military commissary offers food and household items sold at cost plus five percent surcharge, eliminating sales tax. The average shopper can save more than 30 percent when compared to shopping in town. During the commissary customer appreciation case lot sale, an average saving of 50 percent or more is available. These benefits extend to online shopping as well. They also offer rewards cards that allow shoppers to add additional promotions, coupons, and discount savings. Shoppers can also enter many commissary contests, sweepstakes, and shopping sprees. Commissaries also offer gift cards and contribute to academic scholarships.

See also
Company store
Sutler
Prison commissary
Base exchange

References

Military life
Retail formats